Bangladesh participated at the 2018 Summer Youth Olympics in Buenos Aires, Argentina from 6 October to 18 October 2018.

Competitors

Archery

Individual

Team

Field hockey 5-a side 

Bangladesh qualified a boys team of 9 athletes at the Asian Championships.

Preliminary round 

Quarterfinals

5–8th place semifinals

Seventh place game

Shooting 

Bangladesh qualified one sport shooter based on its performance at the 2017 Asian Championships. They also received a quota through the tripartite commission. 

Team

References

2018 in Bangladeshi sport
Nations at the 2018 Summer Youth Olympics
Bangladesh at the Youth Olympics